Kamila Holpuchová (born 27 September 1973) is a retired female race walker from the Czech Republic. She set her personal best (44.20 minutes) in the women's 10 km road race on May 23, 1993.

Achievements

References

1973 births
Living people
Czechoslovak female racewalkers
Czech female racewalkers
World Athletics Championships athletes for Czechoslovakia
World Athletics Championships athletes for the Czech Republic